The UEFA European Under-17 Championship 2007 Final Tournament was held in Belgium from 2 to 13 May 2007. Top-five teams (two best places from each group plus winner of playoff between third-placed teams) qualified for the FIFA U-17 World Cup 2007. Players born after 1 January 1990 could participate in this competition.

Qualifications
There were separate rounds of qualifications being held before the Final Tournament.
2007 UEFA European Under-17 Championship qualifying round
2007 UEFA European Under-17 Championship elite round

Teams
 (host)

Match Officials 
A total of 6 referees, 8 assistant referees and 2 fourth officials were appointed for the final tournament.

Referees
 Alan Black
 Andrea de Marco
Dejan Filipovic
 Jan Jílek
 George Vadachkoria
 Bülent Yıldırım

Assistant referees
 Jan-Peter Aravirta
 Andrei Bodean
 Alan Camilleri
 Nikolai Karakolev
 Arnis Lemkins
 Radoslaw Siejka
 Magnus Sjöblom
 Zsolt Attila Szpisjak

Fourth officials
 Karim Saadouni
 Gaëtan Simon

Squads

Group stage

Group A

Group B

Knockout stage

5th place playoff

Semi-finals

Final

Goalscorers

3 goals
 Victor Moses
 Toni Kroos

2 goals
 Kevin Kis
 Nill De Pauw
 Niels Ringoot
 Thibault Bourgeois
 Damien Le Tallec
 Yann M'Vila
 Daley Blind
 Marko Vejinović
 Iago Falque
 Bojan

1 goal
 Christian Benteke
 Eden Hazard
 Henri Lansbury
 Rhys Murphy
 Krystian Pearce
 Tristan Plummer
 Danny Rose
 Sascha Bigalke
 Richard Sukuta-Pasu
 Kolbeinn Sigþórsson
 Patrick van Aanholt
 Nacer Barazite
 Luciano Narsingh
 Luis Pedro
 Georginio Wijnaldum
 Dani Aquino
 Ignacio Camacho
 Fran Mérida
 Artur Karnoza
 Dmytro Korkishko
 Serhiy Shevchuk

Own goals
 David Rochela (for  Belgium)

Golden Player
 Bojan

References

Report
UEFA.com
RSSSF.com

 
2007
UEFA
UEFA
2007
May 2007 sports events in Europe
2007 in youth association football